Organized in 1989 by the BPI Foundation, Inc., the corporate social responsibility arm of the Bank of the Philippine Islands (BPI), with the Department of Science and Technology (DOST), the BPI-DOST Science Awards recognizes exceptional science and engineering students from partner universities nationwide. These students are individuals whose efforts made them excel in specialized fields of science such as mathematics, physics, engineering, chemistry, biology, and computer science. The awardees are recognized for their potential contributions to industry and nation-building and selected based on their academic and research performance and nomination from the school.

Selection process
The preparation for the awards is a very long and tedious process. Every year in June, the BPI Foundation selects three entries from the ten partner universities, and by July, all the invitations, materials, and all preparations are complete. Acceptance of formal nominations closes in October. By February, all the arrangements for the awarding ceremonies are made.

The foundation gathers the three best entries from the ten partner universities each year. These are Ateneo de Davao University, Ateneo de Manila University, De La Salle University, Saint Louis University, Silliman University, University of the Philippines (Diliman and Los Banes), University of San Carlos, University of Santo Tomas, and Xavier University – Ateneo de Cagayan.

To qualify, the nominee must be a Filipino citizen and a regular student majoring in the following fields: mathematics, physics, chemistry, engineering, computer science, and biology. In addition, the nominee must have a consistent and outstanding academic, leadership, and research record in their school.

The schools must submit their nominees to the BPI-DOST Science Committee.

The BPI handles the business feasibility of the research, while DOST assesses the scientific aspect. From 30 research projects, the evaluators trim down the entries to 12 semifinalists. DOST again narrows them down to six finalists.

The finalists then undergo oral evaluation by a joint BPI-DOST panel of experts. Finally, the experts choose the winners of the Best Project of the Year Awards.

The main criteria for judging projects are adherence to scientific soundness, relevance, impact on knowledge advancement, commercial viability, and the study's originality.

Winners get a P200,000 research grant, a P50,000 cash incentive, and a trophy. First- and second-prize winners receive P30,000 and P10,000, respectively, and a trophy each.

All the original 30 outstanding student awardees chosen get P25,000 cash prizes, trophies, and an invitation to work as BPI junior officers.

Awardees
From 1989 to 2004, equal awards were given to the top 3 candidates from each university. Note that awards were first given to candidates from Silliman University and Xavier University in 1990, Ateneo de Davao University in 1994, and Saint Louis University in 1998.

‡ - ?

From 2004 to the present, the format was changed, in which a single winner and 2 runners-up were selected from the top candidates of various universities

From 2016 to 2017, the format was changed, in which 2 winners were awarded Best in Applied Research and Best in Basic Science Research as selected from the top 30  candidates of various competing universities:

References

Science and technology awards
Philippine science and technology awards